Union Turnpike may refer to:

Union Turnpike (New York)
Kew Gardens–Union Turnpike (IND Queens Boulevard Line), subway station
Union Turnpike (Hudson County, New Jersey)